"Can't Blame a Girl for Trying" is the debut single by American singer Sabrina Carpenter from her debut extended play of the same name (2014), serving as the opening track of the EP. The track appears on her debut studio album, Eyes Wide Open, serving as the second track of the record. The song was produced by Brian Malouf and written by Meghan Trainor, Al Anderson and Chris Gelbuda. The song was released by Hollywood Records as the lead single from Can't Blame a Girl for Trying on March 14, 2014 onto iTunes and was premiered a day before exclusively on Radio Disney. "Can't Blame a Girl for Trying" is a midtempo pop folk song with influences of pop music backed by an acoustic guitar. Lyrically, the song speaks about being foolish in love and making mistakes, but never blaming those who make them. According to Carpenter, the song perfectly describes a thirteen-year-old girl and a teenage girl.

It was accompanied by a music video directed by Kinga Burza premiered on her Vevo channel on March 28, 2014. The song won a Radio Disney Music Award in the category "Best Crush Song" in 2015.

Background and recording
"Can't Blame a Girl for Trying" was written in 2012 by Meghan Trainor, Al Anderson and Chris Gelbuda. Trainor first performed the song at Durango Songwriter's Expo in 2012. Later, Trainor shared a video at her official Facebook account about the song, but it was later removed. In 2013, Carpenter received the role of Maya Hart in the Disney Channel series Girl Meets World and she signed a record deal with Hollywood Records. In the same year, Trainor gave the song to Carpenter and Brian Malouf produced the track. The song was the first to be recorded to her first EP. "Can't Blame a Girl for Trying" was released as the debut single of Carpenter's career at 14 March 2014 onto iTunes and was premiered a day before exclusively on Radio Disney. The song was also included on Carpenter's first studio album, Eyes Wide Open, which was released on April 14, 2015.

The song was recorded somewhere in 2013 and was produced by Brian Malouf. Malouf mixed the track at Cookie Jar Recording, located in Sherman Oaks, California and Chris Thompson engineered the track. In the track, Malouf played keyboards and Jim McGorman play acoustic guitar, electric guitar, bass and glockenspiel. Malouf programmed the drums and McGorman handled the hand percussion. The song was mastered by Eric Boulanger at The Mastering Lab, Inc., located in Ojai, California.

Composition and lyrical interpretation

Musically, "Can’t Blame a Girl for Trying" is a two minutes and forty-nine seconds acoustic guitar-driven midtempo folk pop song with pop influences. In terms of music notation, "Can’t Blame a Girl for Trying" was composed using  common time in the key of C major, with a moderately fast tempo of 144 beats per minute. The song follows the chord progression of C–Dm7-Am-F in the verses and C-Caug-C6-C7-F-Fm in the chorus and Carpenter's vocal range spans from the low note A3 to the high note of F5, giving the song one octaves and five notes of range. The tempo has a Swing feel. Lyrically, the song speaks about being foolish in love and making mistakes, but never blaming those who make them. According to Carpenter the song "perfectly describes a thirteen year-old girl and a teenage girl."

Music video

Background and release
The music video was directed by Kinga Burza and it was premiered on Vevo and YouTube on March 28, 2014. The behind the scenes of the music video was premiered on May 23, 2014 in the same platforms. A lyric video was premiered on YouTube on July 18, 2014 and it features various scenes of her behind the scenes music video, her photoshoots, her live performance on Disney Playlist Sessions and her Disney Channel events.

Synopsis

The video begins with Carpenter sleeping in her bed, next to her bed there is a bedside table with an alarm clock with books underneath, a lamp and a glass of water. Her alarm clock rings, but when she turns it off, her alarm clock turns into a cactus. Scared, Carpenter takes her hand off and hits the glass that falls on the floor. She gets up, but when she gets up she watered the foot and then the water turns into glitter. She wears her robe and makes up her bed, while she was tidying up her bed she pushes a sheet and turns it into a table towel. The next scene shows Carpenter in a red dress spinning to sit on a chair, but instead of sitting on a chair, she sits on a couch. Leaving a door, Carpenter takes off the dress she was wearing at the last scene and it shows a shirt with jeans behind it; She sits down on the couch and starts playing several "instruments" like a guitar, a tennis racket and a ukulele.

When she ends up singing the first chorus, it shows a scene when she was tying her Converse in her bedroom, she leaves the chair she was sitting and her Converse turns into roller skates; later, in the final scene of the video, she falls and takes off the curtains and drops in her bed. Carpenter opens an umbrella at home and when she opens the umbrella, she appears outside the house spinning the umbrella near to an orange tree. She appears using a bunch of hats, sunglasses and making fruit as objects. One of the last scenes is Carpenter answering a phone call but the phone turns into a banana. In all the video, it shows a scene where Carpenter is sitting and singing the song.

Critical reception
Michelle McGahan of PopCrush called the video "a perfect introduction to the star, who is adorably goofy in the sweet vid for the upbeat song. Carpenter shows off her feminine side with loose blonde waves and a barrage of silly ensembles that she dresses up in throughout the video. But she also shows off her musicianship, playing both the acoustic guitar and ukelele (and even a tennis racket) while singing her heart out."

Critical reception
Monique Melendez of Billboard pointed the relatability of the song by saying: "[...] the lyrics cross the generational gap with their relatability, with lyrics like "Here I am again, the same old situation / Why does the guy thing have to be so complicated." Anna Marie of A Kid's Point of You said "The EP kicks off with the title track / hit single , “Can’t Blame A Girl For Trying.” Flawless vocals, an undeniably sophisticated edge, and an effortless ability to inspire listeners makes this song a feel-good anthem (not to mention the adorable music video). This is a cute song about an innocent love story, and it speaks to the girls who make mistakes, but keep trying." Dolph Malone of Headline Planet said "Valuable from a marketing standpoint, the inclusion of two Meghan Trainor co-writes is even more valuable from a musical standpoint. “Can’t Blame a Girl for Trying” and “Darling I’m a Mess,” those songs, possess the same self-awareness and same intimate, conversational approach that fuels Trainor’s own hits."

Live performances
Carpenter first performed the song at the 2014 Radio Disney Music Awards along with "The Middle of Starting Over". A few time later, she performed on City at BT Studio where she was wearing a blue dress. She performed an acoustic version of the song on Perez TV along with "The Middle of Starting Over". She performed the song at D23 Expo in 2015 along with "Take on the World", "We'll Be the Stars", a cover of "FourFiveSeconds", "The Middle of Starting Over" and "Eyes Wide Open". In 2016, Carpenter performed the song on the Honda Stage at the iHeartRadio Theater LA along with some covers and songs from his first and second album.

Credits and personnel 
Recording and management
Mixed at Cookie Jar Recording (Sherman Oaks, California)
Mastered at The Mastering Lab, Inc. (Ojai, California)
Year of the Dog Music (ASCAP), a division of Big Yellow Dog, LLC administered by Words & Music; International Dog Music (BMI), a division of Big Yellow Dog, LLC/Bucked Up Music (BMI), administered by Words & Music; National Dog Music (SESAC), a division of Big Yellow Dog, LLC administered by Words & Music

Personnel

Sabrina Carpenter – lead vocals
Meghan Trainor – songwriting
Al Anderson – songwriting
Chris Gelbuda – songwriting
Brian Malouf – production, mixing, drum programming, keyboards
Chris Thompson – engineering
Jim McGorman – acoustic guitar, electric guitar, bass, glockenspiel, hand percussion
Eric Boulanger – mastering

Credits adapted from Eyes Wide Open liner notes.

Awards and nominations

Release history

References

2014 debut singles
2014 songs
Sabrina Carpenter songs
Songs written by Meghan Trainor
Hollywood Records singles
American folk rock songs